The 1952 Labour Party deputy leadership election took place on 11 November 1952, after sitting deputy leader Herbert Morrison was challenged by Aneurin Bevan.

Candidates
 Herbert Morrison, incumbent Deputy Leader, Member of Parliament for Lewisham South
 Aneurin Bevan, former Minister of Labour and National Service, Member of Parliament for Ebbw Vale

Results

Sources
http://privatewww.essex.ac.uk/~tquinn/labour_party_deputy.htm 

1952
1952 elections in the United Kingdom
Labour Party deputy leadership election
November 1952 events in the United Kingdom